The NZR S class (later WAGR I class) was a class of seven 0-6-4T single Fairlie steam locomotives used in New Zealand.

History
The locomotives were ordered by the New Zealand Railways Department (NZR) in 1880, and delivered from the Avonside engine works in 1881–1882. The S Class Locomotive's driving Wheels were intentionally built not rigidly fixed to the Frame like a conventional  Locomotive. This benefited New Zealand Lines as curves can be sharp and short. This allowed them to operate on lines such as the old Wairarapa Line Route up the Rimutaka Ranges from Upper Hutt to Summit more easily.
They were considerably larger than the earlier R class, and which saw service in the Whanganui district and the Remutaka Ranges, with its abundance of sharp curves and grades. These two classes of Single Fairlies were considerably more popular with the engine crews than their older Double Fairlie counterparts, which often suffered frame breakages whilst operating in the Wanganui district.

Sale to WAGR
In 1891 despite complaining of a lack of motive power, the residing chief mechanical engineer T.F. Rotheram arranged the shipment of three of this class to the Western Australian Government Railways (WAGR), where they were classified as the I class. They remained in service for WAGR until 1900.

See also
 NZR E class (1872)
 NZR B class (1874)
 NZR R class
 Locomotives of New Zealand

References

Citations

Bibliography 

 
 

S class
I WAGR class
0-6-4T locomotives
Avonside locomotives
Fairlie locomotives
3 ft 6 in gauge locomotives of New Zealand
Scrapped locomotives
Railway locomotives introduced in 1880
Passenger locomotives